Jordan Tyler Whitehead (born March 18, 1997) is an American football safety for the New York Jets of the National Football League (NFL). He played college football at Pittsburgh.

Early years
Whitehead attended Central Valley High School in Monaca, Pennsylvania. In addition to playing football, he also ran track. He played on both sides of the ball for Central Valley and was a starter since his freshman year. As a senior, Whitehead caught 24 passes for 471 yards along with rushing for 1,933 yards on 148 attempts. He totaled 35 touchdowns along with tallying 97 tackles and seven interceptions. Whitehead committed to play football for the Pittsburgh Panthers on October 3, 2014, choosing the Panthers over the likes of Penn State and West Virginia.

College career
As a true freshman in 2015, Whitehead played in all 13 of Pittsburgh's games, starting in the last 12. Offensively, he carried the ball 12 times for 122 yards resulting in two touchdowns. On defense, he tallied 108 tackles, one interception, six pass deflections and one fumble recovery. He was named the ACC's Rookie of the Year and Defensive Rookie of the Year by the Atlantic Coast Sports Media Association along with being named to USA Today's All-American Team, being named the ACC's Defensive Rookie of the Year, and being named to the ACC's All-Conference Third-team.

In 2016, Whitehead played in Pitt's first nine games before missing their last three due to injury. In nine games, Whitehead compiled 65 tackles, one interception returned 59 yards for a touchdown, two pass deflections and a forced fumble along with rushing for 98 yards on nine attempts. He was awarded a second-team all ACC spot, even though he did not play all 12 games.

As a junior in 2017 Whitehead missed Pitt's first three games, but played in the last nine. Defensively, he tallied 60 tackles, four pass deflections, and one interception. On offense, he ran the ball 22 times for 142 yards and caught two passes for seven yards. After the season, Whitehead declared for the 2018 NFL Draft, forgoing his senior year.

Professional career

Tampa Bay Buccaneers

2018 season
The Tampa Bay Buccaneers selected Whitehead in the fourth round with the 117th overall pick in the 2018 NFL Draft. Whitehead was the 10th safety drafted in 2018.

On May 10, 2018, the Tampa Bay Buccaneers signed Whitehead to a four-year, $3.12 million contract that includes a signing bonus of $667,257.

Throughout training camp, Whitehead competed for a role as a starting safety against Keith Tandy, Chris Conte, and Justin Evans. Head coach Dirk Koetter named Whitehead the third backup free safety on the depth chart, behind Chris Conte and Keith Tandy.

He made his professional regular season debut in the Tampa Bay Buccaneers’ season-opening 48–40 victory at the New Orleans Saints. Whitehead was inactive for the Buccaneers’ Week 4 loss at the Chicago Bears due to a shoulder and hamstring injury. On October 14, 2018, Whitehead earned his first career start after Chris Conte was placed on injured reserve due to a knee injury. Whitehead finished the Buccaneers’ 34–29 loss at the Atlanta Falcons with six combined tackles. In Week 12, he collected a season-high ten solo tackles and broke up two pass attempts during a 27–9 win against the San Francisco 49ers. He finished his rookie season in 2018 with 76 combined tackles (61 solo) and four pass deflections in 15 games and 11 starts.

2019 season
Whitehead recorded his first career interception in a 55–40 win over the Los Angeles Rams.
In week 9 against the Seattle Seahawks, Whitehead recovered a fumble forced by teammate Devin White on running back Chris Carson in the 40–34 loss. In Week 15, during a 38–17 win against the Detroit Lions, Whitehead injured his hamstring and left the game. On December 18, 2019, Whitehead was placed on injured reserve. He finished his second professional season with 69 tackles, nine pass deflections, one interception, and one fumble recovery.

2020 season
In Week 2 against the Carolina Panthers, Whitehead recorded his first interception of the season off a pass thrown by Teddy Bridgewater during the 31–17 win.
In Week 3 against the Denver Broncos, Whitehead recorded his first career sack during the 28–10 win.
In Week 11 against the Los Angeles Rams on Monday Night Football, Whitehead intercepted a pass thrown by Jared Goff during the 27–24 loss.  This was Whitehead's second interception of the season and it set a single season career high.

In the NFC Championship against the Green Bay Packers, Whitehead forced a fumble on running back Aaron Jones that was recovered by teammate Devin White during the 31–26 win. Whitehead played in Super Bowl LV, a 31–9 victory over the Kansas City Chiefs. He recorded two solo tackles in the game.

New York Jets
On March 17, 2022, Jordan Whitehead signed a two-year, $14.5 million contract with the New York Jets. On October 2, Whitehead would record his first interception of the season off Steelers’ QB Kenny Pickett's first career pass attempt.

NFL career statistics

Regular season

Personal life
Whitehead is the cousin of former NFL cornerback Darrelle Revis and Stanley E Sims Jr.

References

External links
Tampa Bay Buccaneers bio
Pittsburgh Panthers bio

1997 births
Living people
American football defensive backs
People from Monaca, Pennsylvania
Pittsburgh Panthers football players
Players of American football from Pennsylvania
Sportspeople from the Pittsburgh metropolitan area
Tampa Bay Buccaneers players
New York Jets players